The Thoreau Tennis Open is a tournament for professional female tennis players played on outdoor hardcourts. The event is classified as a WTA 125 tournament and has been held in Concord, Massachusetts, United States, since 2019.

Past finals

Singles

Doubles

External links 
 
 ITF search

WTA 125 tournaments
ITF Women's World Tennis Tour
Recurring sporting events established in 2019
Hard court tennis tournaments in the United States
Tennis in Massachusetts